Phanerochaete is a genus of crust fungi in the family Phanerochaetaceae.

Taxonomy
The genus was circumscribed by Finnish mycologist Petter Karsten in 1889. Marinus Anton Donk redefined the limits of the genus in two publications in 1957 and 1962. Phanerochaete has traditionally been delimited based on the overall morphology of the fruit body, as well as microscopic characteristics including the nature of the hyphal structure, cystidia, and spores. Molecular analyses demonstrate that the genus is polyphyletic, containing members placed throughout the phlebioid clade of the Polyporales.

The genus name is derived from the Greek words φανεφός ("distinct") and χαίτη ("hair").

Description
Phanerochaete species have membranaceous, crust-like fruit bodies. The hyphal system is monomitic, with simple-septate generative hyphae; single or multiple clamps may be present in the subiculum. The basidia (spore-bearing cells) are club-shaped and smooth. Spores of the genus are thin-walled, inamyloid, hyaline, and have a cylindrical to ellipsoidal shape. Phanerochaete species cause white rot on both conifers and hardwoods.

Chemistry
Phanerochaete includes white rot fungi that are able to degrade the woody polymer lignin to carbon dioxide. This is achieved, in part, by lignin peroxidases and manganese peroxidases. These peroxidases are also able to mediate oxidation of a wide variety of organic pollutants. The genome of Phanerochaete chrysosporium was sequenced and shows the genetic potential to make over 100 cytochrome P450 monooxygenases. White rot fungi have been used in bioremediation efforts to break down potentially harmful chemicals in soil and in water. For example, phenol-formaldehyde is degraded by P. chrysosporium, while P. sordida breaks down the neonicotinoid pesticide clothianidin.

Species
, Index Fungorum accepts 92 species of Phanerochaete:
Phanerochaete aculeata Hallenb. (1978)
Phanerochaete affinis (Burt) Parmasto (1968)
Phanerochaete alba Sang H.Lin & Z.C.Chen (1990) – Taiwan
Phanerochaete albida  Sheng H.Wu (1990)
Phanerochaete allantospora Burds. & Gilb. (1974)
Phanerochaete alnea (Fr.) P.Karst. (1889)
Phanerochaete aluticolor (Bres. & Torrend) Melo, J.Cardoso, M.Dueñas, Salcedo & Tellería (2012)
Phanerochaete andreae Burds., Beltrán-Tej. & Rodr.-Armas (1995)
Phanerochaete angustocystidiata Sheng H.Wu (2000) – Taiwan
Phanerochaete arenata (P.H.B.Talbot) Jülich (1979)
Phanerochaete areolata (G.Cunn.) Hjortstam & Ryvarden (1990)
Phanerochaete argillacea Sheng H.Wu (1998) – Taiwan
Phanerochaete arizonica Burds. & Gilb. (1974)
Phanerochaete aurantiobadia Ghobad-Nejhad, S.L.Liu & E.Langer (2015)
Phanerochaete australis Jülich (1980)
Phanerochaete avellanea (Bres.) J.Erikss. & Hjortstam (1981)
Phanerochaete bambucicola Sheng H.Wu (2018)
Phanerochaete binucleospordida Boidin, Lanq. & Gilles (1993)
Phanerochaete brunnea Sheng H.Wu (1990)
Phanerochaete bubalina Burds. (1985)
Phanerochaete burtii (Romell ex Burt) Parmasto (1967)
Phanerochaete cacaina (Bourdot & Galzin) Burds. & Gilb. (1974)
Phanerochaete cana (Burt) Burds. (1985)
Phanerochaete capitata Sheng H.Wu (1998) – Taiwan
Phanerochaete carnosa (Burt) Parmasto (1967)
Phanerochaete caucasica (Parmasto) Burds. (1985)
Phanerochaete citri A.B.De (1991) – India
Phanerochaete citrinosanguinea D.Floudas & Hibbett (2015)
Phanerochaete commixtoides Sang H.Lin & Z.C.Chen (1990)
Phanerochaete conifericola D.Floudas & D.S.Hibbett (2015)
Phanerochaete cordylines (G.Cunn.) Burds. (1985)
Phanerochaete cremeo-ochracea (Bourdot & Galzin) Hjortstam (1987)
Phanerochaete crescentispora Gilb. & Hemmes (2001)
Phanerochaete cryptocystidiata Nakasone (2008)
Phanerochaete deflectens (P.Karst.) Hjortstam (1987)
Phanerochaete eburnea Sheng H.Wu (1998) – Taiwan
Phanerochaete eichleriana Bres. (1903)
Phanerochaete emplastra (Berk. & Broome) Hjortstam (1989)
Phanerochaete exigua (Burt) Nakasone, Burds. & Lodge (1998)
Phanerochaete exilis (Burt) Burds. (1985)
Phanerochaete flava (Burt) Nakasone, Burds. & Lodge (1998)
Phanerochaete flavidogrisea Sheng H.Wu (1998) – Taiwan
Phanerochaete flavocarnea (Petch) Hjortstam (1995)
Phanerochaete fulva Sheng H.Wu (1998) – Taiwan
Phanerochaete furfuraceovelutinus (Rick) Rajchenb. (1987)
Phanerochaete globosa Sang H.Lin & Z.C.Chen (1990) – Taiwan
Phanerochaete granulata Sheng H.Wu (2007)
Phanerochaete hiulca (Burt) A.L.Welden (1980)
Phanerochaete hyphocystidiata Sheng H.Wu (1998) – Taiwan
Phanerochaete incarnata Sheng H.Wu (2017) – Taiwan
Phanerochaete incrustans (Speg.) Rajchenb. & J.E.Wright (1987)
Phanerochaete infuscata Hjortstam & Ryvarden (2004)
Phanerochaete intertexta Sheng H.Wu (1990)
Phanerochaete investiens (Berk.) P.Roberts (2009)
Phanerochaete jose-ferreirae (D.A.Reid) D.A.Reid (1975)
Phanerochaete laevis (Fr.) J.Erikss. & Ryvarden (1978)
Phanerochaete leptoderma Sheng H.Wu (1990)
Phanerochaete lutea (Sheng H.Wu) Hjortstam (1995)
Phanerochaete luteoaurantiaca (Wakef.) Burds. (1985)
Phanerochaete macrocystidiata Hallenb. (1978)
Phanerochaete martelliana (Bres.) J.Erikss. & Ryvarden (1978)
Phanerochaete mauiensis Gilb. & Adask. (1993)
Phanerochaete odontoidea Sheng H.Wu (2000) – Taiwan
Phanerochaete oreophila Gilb. & Hemmes (2004)
Phanerochaete pallida Parmasto (1967)
Phanerochaete parmastoi Sheng H.Wu (1990)
Phanerochaete parvispora Sheng H.Wu & Losi (1995) – Europe
Phanerochaete percitrina P.Roberts & Hjortstam (2000) – Africa
Phanerochaete phosphorescens (Burt) A.L.Welden (1980)
Phanerochaete porostereoides S.L.Liu & S.H.He (2016) – China
Phanerochaete pseudosanguinea D.Floudas & D.S.Hibbett (2015)
Phanerochaete queletii (Bres.) Nakasone (2008)
Phanerochaete radulans Hallenb. (1978)
Phanerochaete reflexa Sheng H.Wu (1998) – Taiwan
Phanerochaete rhodella (Peck) D.Floudas & D.S.Hibbett (2015)
Phanerochaete robusta Parmasto (1968)
Phanerochaete rubescens Sheng H.Wu (1998) – Taiwan
Phanerochaete sacchari (Burt) Burds. (1985)
Phanerochaete salmoneolutea Burds. & Gilb. (1974)
Phanerochaete sanguineocarnosa D.Floudas & Hibbett (2015)
Phanerochaete sanwicensis Gilb. & Hemmes (2004)
Phanerochaete sordida (P.Karst.) J.Erikss. & Ryvarden (1978)

Phanerochaete stereoides Sheng H.Wu (1995)
Phanerochaete suballantoidea Sheng H.Wu (1998) – Taiwan
Phanerochaete subceracea (Burt) Burds. (1985)
Phanerochaete subcrassispora P.Roberts & Hjortstam (2009)
Phanerochaete subglobosa Sheng H.Wu (1990)
Phanerochaete subiculosa (Burt) Burds. (1985)
Phanerochaete taiwaniana Sheng H.Wu (1990)
Phanerochaete tamariciphila Boidin, Lanq. & Gilles (1993)
Phanerochaete thailandica Kout & Sádlíková (2017) – Thailand
Phanerochaete tropica (Sheng H.Wu) Hjortstam (1995)
Phanerochaete tuberculascens Hjortstam (2000)
Phanerochaete tuberculata (P.Karst.) Parmasto (1968)
Phanerochaete velutina (DC.) P.Karst. (1898)
Phanerochaete vesiculosa S.Martínez & Nakasone (2005) – Uruguay
Phanerochaete xerophila Burds. (1985)

References

Further reading

 

 
Phanerochaetaceae
Polyporales genera
Taxa named by Petter Adolf Karsten
Taxa described in 1889